Paokhum Ama (English: The Only Answer)  is a 1983 Indian Meitei language film and also the first colour cinema of Manipur. The film is directed by Aribam Syam Sharma and written by M. K. Binodini Devi. It stars Kangabam Tomba and Yengkhom Roma in the lead roles. The movie was premiered at the Tyneside International Film Festival, United Kingdom.

Synopsis
The film explores the different life styles of modern India. In urban society corruption is rife, careers advanced by bribes and influence. But there is an alternative: life in the hills, where the people face life silently and accept nature's gifts. In this ultimately optimistic film, a Manipuri youth lives through personal pain and disappointment to face with new hope and energy the struggle of his family for a different way of life.

Cast
 Kangabam Tomba as Iboyaima
 Yengkhom Roma as Harmila
 Soraisam Dhiren as Iboyaima's brother
 Huirem Manglem as Sanahal
 Thokchom Ongbi Jamini as Bina
 Kshetrimayum Rashi
 Wangkhem Lalitkumar

Accolades
Yengkhom Roma won the Best Actress Award at the 1st Manipur State Film Awards 1984 for her role of Harmila in the film.

References

External links
 

Meitei-language films
1983 films
Films directed by Aribam Syam Sharma